Route 553, or Highway 553, may refer to:

Canada
 Ontario Highway 553

Israel
Route 553 (Israel)

United States